Arturo Marcelino DeFreites Simon (born April 26, 1953) is a former professional baseball first baseman. He played parts of two seasons in Major League Baseball, 1978 and 1979, for the Cincinnati Reds.

Following his major league career, DeFreites played in the Mexican League from 1980 until 1986. He was also a minor league baseball manager for the Gulf Coast League Expos in 2004 and the Dorados de Chihuahua in 2009.

External links

1953 births
Living people
Broncos de Reynosa players
Cincinnati Reds players
Dominican Republic expatriate baseball players in Canada
Dominican Republic expatriate baseball players in Mexico
Dominican Republic expatriate baseball players in the United States
Dominican Republic people of Cocolo descent
Indianapolis Indians players
Key West Conchs players

Leones de Yucatán players
Major League Baseball first basemen
Major League Baseball players from the Dominican Republic
Montreal Expos scouts
Minor league baseball managers
Sportspeople from San Pedro de Macorís
Plataneros de Tabasco players
Rieleros de Aguascalientes players
Sioux Falls Packers players
Toledo Mud Hens players
Trois-Rivières Aigles players